Stéphan Grégoire (born May 14, 1969 in Neufchâteau, Vosges) is a French race car driver currently living in Zionsville, Indiana.

Gregoire is a veteran of the 24 Hours of Le Mans, Rolex Sports Car Series, the Indianapolis 500, and the Indy Racing League. He made 44 IRL starts between 1996 and 2001 with a best finish of 2nd at Pikes Peak International Raceway in 1997. In that season he also recorded his best ever points finish of 11th. In his 6 Indy 500 starts he has a best finish of 8th in 2000. Gregoire was in an accident late in the 2000 season at the Texas Motor Speedway during a test run which caused him to have bruises to his left knee and ankle. He returned to the IRL and the "500"  for the 2006 race in a car fielded by Team Leader Motorsports and finished 29th.

Gregoire was set to return to the Indy 500 in 2007 for Chastain Motorsports, the team he drove for in 1997 and 1998. A crash in practice on May 17, ended his chances. Gregoire broke a bone in his back and would not be able to qualify for the 2007 "500."  The Chastain team named Roberto Moreno their replacement driver and he successfully made the race.

Stephan Gregoire has two daughters and a son named Roméo Gregoire, who was the lead bass singer of the local band named “The Papercuts” and also has very large toes.

Racing record

American open–wheel
(key)

CART

IRL

Indy 500 results

24 Hours of Le Mans results

References

https://web.archive.org/web/20120628124359/http://www.stephangregoire.net/
Where Are They Now Article

1969 births
Living people
People from Neufchâteau, Vosges
French racing drivers
IndyCar Series drivers
Indianapolis 500 drivers
Rolex Sports Car Series drivers
French Formula Three Championship drivers
British Formula 3000 Championship drivers
24 Hours of Le Mans drivers
Sportspeople from Vosges (department)
Vision Racing drivers